New York State Route 910D (NY 910D) is a  unsigned reference route designation for Washington Avenue Extension, a divided highway extension of Washington Avenue in Albany, New York, in the United States. The state-maintained portion of the highway begins at an intersection with NY 155 (here county-maintained as County Route 157 or CR 157) and ends just east of CR 156 (Fuller Road) at Interstate 90 (I-90) exit 2. Past I-90 and University Avenue, the highway is maintained by the city of Albany and known as Washington Avenue. Washington Avenue Extension was constructed in the late 1960s and open to traffic by 1973.

Route description
Washington Avenue Extension (unsigned NY 910D) begins at an intersection with NY 155 (here county-maintained as CR 157) near the western Albany city line. The highway heads southeastward as a four-lane divided highway, paralleling the routing of nearby Interstate 90 (I-90) to New York State Thruway exit 24. This portion of Washington Avenue Extension is flanked on both sides by named Frontage Roads, both of which begin at NY 155. The northern road ends prior to Rapp Road while the southern road ends just short of Crossgates Mall.

At exit 24, Washington Avenue Extension dips southward to serve Crossgates Mall and avoid exit 1 on the Adirondack Northway (I-87) and the Northside Route (I-90). Past the interchange, the road returns northeastward and follows I-90 east to CR 156 (Fuller Road). From Fuller Road it continues eastward to a junction with the on-off ramps for I-90 eastbound and University Drive which leads to the University at Albany uptown campus. At this junction, state jurisdiction of Washington Avenue ends and Washington Avenue continues into downtown Albany as a city street. This section of Washington Avenue connects to the W. Averell Harriman State Office Complex, and NY 85.

At Crossgates, Washington Avenue Extension curves southward around the exit 1 interchange of I-90 and the Northway, curving northward afterward to resume it original course.

History
When the New York State Thruway was constructed near Albany in the early 1950s, exit 24 on the highway initially connected to Washington Avenue, a city street leading into downtown Albany. In the mid-1960s, the portion of Washington Avenue from the Thruway to Fuller Road was dismantled as part of the construction of the Northside Route; that is, the modern routing of I-90 through downtown Albany. At the same time, construction began on a new divided highway routing for Washington Avenue between Fuller Road and NY 155 along the southern edge of I-90. The highway, named Washington Avenue Extension, was completed by 1973 and designated as NY 910D, an unsigned reference route.

As of May 2012, major reconstruction work is well underway to realign Washington Avenue Extension to the north of the CSNE UAlbany Nanotech College complex at its intersection with Fuller Road and build a roundabout interchange. The current signalized intersection will be replaced with a two-lane roundabout with an overpass carrying Washington Avenue through traffic. When the reconstruction was completed, NY 910D was extended eastward to I-90 exit 2 and University Drive.

Exit List

See also

References

10D
Transportation in Albany County, New York